Traci Wolfe (born December 27, 1960) is an American film actress and model, known for her role as Rianne Murtaugh in all four films of the Lethal Weapon series.

Career
Prior to acting, Wolfe was a Wilhelmina Model. In the 1987 film Lethal Weapon, Wolfe played Rianne Murtaugh, the daughter of Danny Glover's character, a role which she would reprise in all three sequels. For her role in the first part of the Lethal Weapon series, she was awarded an NAACP Image Award in the category of Outstanding Supporting Actress in a Motion Picture the year it was released. She was seen again as Rianne Murtaugh in 1989's Lethal Weapon 2 and later reprised the role in Lethal Weapon 3 (1992) and Lethal Weapon 4 (1998).

Outside of Lethal Weapon, Wolfe guest starred on The Cosby Show and one episode of In the Heat of the Night as Nicole Sands, a niece of Virgil Tibbs.

Personal life
During the 1990s, Wolfe volunteered at the Maryland Museum of African Art and lived in Columbia, Maryland.

Filmography

References

External links
 

1960 births
American film actresses
American television actresses
Living people
20th-century American actresses
21st-century American actresses